Olga de Amaral (born 1932) is a Colombian textile and  visual artist known for her large-scale abstract works made with fibers and covered in gold and/or silver leaf. Because of her ability to reconcile local concerns with international developments, de Amaral became one of the few artists from South America to become internationally known for her work in fiber during the 1960s and ‘70s. She is also considered an important practitioner in the development of postwar Latin American Abstraction. She currently lives and works in Bogotá, Colombia.

Biography and education

Olga de Amaral was born Olga Ceballos Velez in 1932 in Bogotá, Cundinamarca, Colombia, to parents from Colombia's Antioquia region. She was raised in a traditional religious family with 5 sisters and 2 brothers. She grew up in a traditional neighbourhood in Bogotá in a warm, safe family atmosphere, maintaining a special relationship with her loving and caring mother. Upon graduating from high school, in the years 1951–52 she got a degree in Architectural Design at the Colegio Mayor de Cundinamarca in Bogotá. After graduation, the future textile artist worked for a year as a director of the Architectural Drawing Faculty at the same school.

In 1954, de Amaral went to New York City to study English at Columbia University. From 1954 to 1955, she studied fiber art at the Cranbrook Academy of Art in Bloomfield Hills, Michigan. She stated about her time there as a student: "In Cranbrook, the textile workshop had eight looms placed against the windows: one of them, in the corner, would be my home for a year. There, I lived my most intimate moments of solitude; there was born my certainty about color; its strength; I felt as if I loved color as though it were something tangible. I also learned to speak in color. I remember with nostalgia that experience in which souls touched hands". At Cranbrook, de Amaral met Jim Amaral and they became close friends.

In 1955, after a year in Cranbrook, she returned to Colombia and started to make decorative textiles on commission for her architect friends. Meanwhile, Jim Amaral served in the U.S. Navy on a base in the Philippines. In 1956, Jim Amaral visited Colombia to see Olga, initially for a few weeks. They married in 1957 and settled in Bogotá. They had two children, Diego and Andrea, and started a workshop for handwoven textiles. During that period, Jack Lenor Larsen visited Colombia and the Amaral's workshop. He expressed interest in Olga's tapestries. Their professional and artistic relationship became crucial in projecting her work into the international world of contemporary tapestry. In 1965, de Amaral founded and taught at the Textile Department at the University of Los Andes (Colombia) in Bogotá.

In 1966-1967 the Amaral family lived in New York. There, Olga de Amaral met Eileen Vanderbilt from the World Crafts Council and became the Council's Colombian representative. With Larsen's collaboration, Olga de Amaral displayed her tapestries in New York City (during a 1967 solo exhibition in Larsen's New York showroom), and taught at Penland School of Crafts in North Carolina and at Haystack Mountain School of Crafts in Maine. After returning to Colombia, the Amarals travelled to Popayán and Tierradentro region with its must-see San Agustín. Later Olga visited Peru as the WCC representative. On a rapid visit to Ireland to participate in a WCC conference, Olga met Lucie Rie, a British ceramist who inspired her to incorporate gold into the tapestries. At the beginning of the seventies, the Amarals moved to Barcelona and then to Paris. They visited Greece, Italy, the Netherlands, Belgium, Switzerland, Sweden, and England. They made contacts with the centres of European art. They lived for a time in Europe, then returned to Bogotá, visited different areas of Colombia, and then went back to France, amid exhibits, work, and new friendships. Another important journey for the artist was her travel to Japan.

Art 
"I am not familiar with current tendencies in textile design. It seems to me that those who weave artistically base themselves only partially on fiber craft, which in my opinion, makes no sense. I consider that one must base oneself on precision, on mathematics, on color theory. What is woven, does not occur by chance, but totally the opposite - it is very calculated. I can't do that because I am not trained and because I am in the midst of an abstraction. Finally, my work is nothing more than my way of telling how I feel about life, about the soul of things." –Olga de Amaral

From the beginning, Olga de Amaral's art has been driven by the creation of works that redefine our notions of unity, concept, representation, and personal expression. de Amaral explores and revisits ideas, techniques, and processes, looking for subtle and intricate variations within her own artistic process. She is an important figure among a globally dispersed group of artists who are deconstructing and rethinking the structure, surface, and support of painting by adding sculptural dimensions and atypical materials. Her work takes the elements of painting off the stretcher and into space, approaching the problem of the superposition, of layering in a painting form the point of view of the material itself – the painting's support, the canvas, the fabric or texture.

At first categorised as two dimensional, representational wall hangings, in the late 1960s her works entered the genres of sculpture, installation, abstract and conceptual art:

"De Amaral's art deftly bridges myriad craft traditions; it's concerned with process and materiality, with the principles of formalism, abstraction and metaphysicality. The artist has developed a distinct voice in her field through her command of conventional techniques for constructing textile objects while progressively pushing the boundaries of orthodox understanding of how textiles work as objects in space. She has gradually moved fabric-based works beyond the category of woven tapestry - one that privileges flatness, adherence to the wall, pictorials, and an obsession with the organic and the physical properties of materials - into a more conceptual practice that embraces strategies otherwise found in painting, sculpture, and architecture."

The way the artist incorporates the materials, natural and man-made fibres, paint, gesso, and precious metals (gold and silver leaf mostly), through the handcraft, artisanal process and techniques, reference Colombia's pre-Hispanic art, indigenous weaving traditions, and the Spanish Colonial Baroque legacy, brought to the New World by the Catholic colonists. As Twylene Moyer indicated, this inspiration is "a true mestizaje, or mixing of cultures." What those cultures had in common, was that they all attributed great expressive power to the visual, just as de Amaral's work embody visual and tactile content "reconnecting us to an ancient understanding and appreciation of images as presences unto themselves, capable of transcending materiality to express truth through beauty". This ability to connect the ancient and the contemporary has allowed the artist to create works on the premise that "art has the power to transcend representation and embody spiritual and emotional values through form. (...) Her tapestries are nothing less than meditations on the illusive nature of meaning."

Thread, color and light determine the visual and metaphorical aspect of de Amaral's works. "I began to work with fiber by coincidence - a sought coincidence - and have continued with it because it has never disappointed me. As I get to know it better, the better it knows me. In briefer words, it has never stopped arousing my curiosity. Fiber is like an old pencil: one has used it for so long that you take it for granted. I am made of fiber because I have embraced it and because I know it". Olga de Amaral on color: "When I think about color, when I touch color, when I live color - the intimate exaltation of my being, my other self - I fly, I feel as another, there is always another being next to me."

de Amaral's art is most often interpreted through the themes of architecture, mathematics, and socio-cultural dichotomies in Colombia, but mostly landscape: "Fascinated by the shapes of rocks, streams, hills, mountains, and clouds, she finds inspiration in the broken textures and movements of the landscapes surrounding her home in Bogotá. From the geometric designs of medieval cosmological diagrams to the grids of Mondrian, harmonious symmetry of form has alluded to and partaken of perfection and the absolute." Her oeuvre is characterized by various series, each with a particular essence or technique that encompass a plethora of intricate variations developed throughout her career. The titles of de Amaral's numerous series reveal the themes behind her weavings: Alchemies, Moonbaskets, Lost Images, Ceremonial Cloths, Writings, Forests, Rivers, Mountains, Moons, Square Suns, Umbras, Stelae, etc. As Amparo Osorio pointed out, "much of poetry (...) emerges from these images in movement, whose titling (…) is another referent for us to achieve an understanding of this recondite sense, of that desire to say in the language of symbols all that is beyond words."

Early work from the 1960s 
The early period of de Amaral's oeuvre is characterised by visually relatively traditional tapestries, but already presenting the search for an individual language through formal experimentations. Since the mid60s, she worked mostly with hand-spun wool, cotton, linen, and dyes. Vivid colors and bold combinations and the exploration of the structure and edges of weaving characterize some of her small scale early work of this period. The geometric conception and composition of these works reveal a profound awareness and understanding of the modern artistic tendencies of the time, bringing to mind the De Stijl abstraction current among others.
In 1966 the Amarals were invited by Miguel Arroyo to show their work at the Fine Arts Museum in Caracas, Venezuela. It was the first solo show by Olga de Amaral outside her native country. In 1967 Olga presented her work for the first time at the prominent Lausanne Biennale in Switzerland, the first out of six later appearances at that event. In 1969 Olga de Amaral took part in a collective exhibition of 27 fiber artists at MoMA New York entitled “Wall Hangings”. It was an international exhibition curated by an architecture and design curator Mildred Constantine organised with Jack Lenor Larsen and presented not in the architecture and design lobby as usual for the fiber artists, but in the art section of MoMA, that up until then was reserved only for painting or sculpture. This was the importance of that exhibition - it addressed the transformations in the medium of fiber art, noted differences between the continents and anticipated the experimentation to come.

In the late 60's, with the creation of the piece Entrelazado en naranja, gris, multicolor (1969), de Amaral eventually "exploded the picture plane from inside out". At the end of this period, the artist left the fundamental concept of fabric weaving (the opposition between warp and weft), by leaving only the warp (in the form of braiding) and letting it float freely. The full form or volume stressed in the composition of the pieces from this period, make them look almost like thread sculptures. However, after this period of pushing the art of weaving to its boundaries, in the next decade, the issue of the flat surface will emerge again in de Amaral's art. Olga's massive hangings called Muros tejidos (Woven Walls), solid bulwarks built from stiff wool and horsehair, debuted at a solo exhibit at the Museum of Contemporary Crafts in New York in 1970. In 1971 Olga took part in an exhibition "Deliberate Entanglements" at the University of California, Los Angeles organised by its art professor Bernard Kester. It showed American and Eastern European fiber art for the first time in Southern California. It reflected the era's revolutionary fiber sculpture, particularly its tendency towards monumentality. "When I started to show my work in Europe and the USA, it was considered art, not crafts. And it was then that I realised that it was not the weaving, but the visual quality that now mattered in my creations."

The shift from crafts to fine art in the 1970s 
In the 1970s Olga de Amaral started the following series: Muros, Corazas, Hojarascas, Marañas, Estructuras, Fragmentos completos, the Calicanto series, Farallones and Eslabones. "From the beginning of her career in the 1960s, certainly from the Muros and Hojarascas of the 1970s, Amaral had made it clear that the debate over whether weaving was art or craft would be, in her case at least, moot. From the onset, there has been a distinct sense in her work that it could, and did, embody important ideas and reflections of an existential and historical character".

The Muros 
The Walls was the first series where the artist started to take more risks that led her to break with predictable geometric patterns and replace them by rhythms that for the first time engaged the eye into the work. The inclusion of the viewer in the experience, together with the growing dimensions of de Amaral's works, marked a threshold in the artist's career and put her on the international fine arts map: “(…) in the late 1960s through the mid-70s (…) fiber artists became more attentive to the shape and dimensions of the architectural context and the phenomenological experience of the viewer.(…) So when a work like Olga de Amaral’s six-story El Gran Muro was installed in 1976 in the lobby of the Westin Peachtree Plaza in Atlanta, the wall functioned less as a backdrop or frame than a determinant of the wool-and-horsehair tapestry’s monumental, vertical form”.

The Fragmentos Completos 
During her stay in Paris in the early 1970s, living in small spaces, Olga created a series of small pieces entitled Complete Fragments (1975). In this series the artist used gold for the first time, playing and experimenting with it. She also started to paint fibres with acrylic paint and gesso to obtain colors directly on the finished woven piece in order to dissolve the geometry imposed by the rigid structure of warp and weft. These poetic sketches were shown at the Rivolta Gallery in Lausanne, Switzerland. This technical innovation gave the artist much more freedom with the final surfaces of the works than the color-dyed fibres. It also moved her tapestries from the "crafts" to the "fine-arts" category. "Color is language common to all cultures. Color helps me to distance myself from the surface to add different meanings to the tapestry." The Fragments begin a period of mostly monochromatic works culminating with the Calicanto series.

The Calicanto series 
The title of the series refers to the stones used for building. The series includes the works Vestiduras de Calicanto, Paredes de Calicanto and Paisajes de calicanto and has been started in 1977. The pieces in this series are larger weavings in grass, light earth tones and sandy hues.

The new materials of the 1980s 
This period is characterized by enthusiastic experimentation and the introduction of new materials. During her visit to Japan for an exhibition at the National Museum of Modern Art in Kyoto, de Amaral begins to explore the use of gold and gesso inspired by Kintsugi, the Japanese art of repairing broken pottery with gold. Her exploration of gold as a material and as a color begins. She also continues to explore the possibilities of structure. Light and air filtering through woven constructions become major players. In the 1980s Olga de Amaral started the following series: Riscos, Tejidos policromos, Tierras, Tablas, Entornos, Cestas lunares, Lienzos ceremoniales, Alquimias and Montañas.

The Riscos 
The title of this series alludes to cliffs. The segmented vertical bands also make allusion to the Inca quipus (khipus/talking knots) - recording devices used to collect data and keep records of time and chores. The quipus were made of colourful threads or cotton/fiber strings. The pieces in the Riscos series are mostly rectangular forms and in contrast with the vertical chained, undulated braids that hang from top to bottom, they create a sense of movement, a nearly kinetic effect. In terms of style the organic effects resemble much a living form, but the works in this series are strictly conceptual - based on the possibilities and changes in fiber structure.

The Lienzos Ceremoniales 
The series Ceremonial Cloths was started in 1986 and continued through 1998. The title refers to ceremonial garments. Each piece in this series is "infused" with strong, deep color that emerges from the unified background surface. This series explores the way in which images emerge from a woven surface and the creation of a sense of depth. The superpositions of layers of thread create an aerial interplay of light that connects this series with Op Art's artistic problems.

The Cestas lunares 
The Moonbaskets explore the same problems as the Ceremonial Cloths - the depth and the abstract colourful images. Each piece within its unique composition studies textural and chromatic shifts on the woven surfaces (each cotton fiber is coated with gesso and paint), where the geometric images emerge  - the circle of sun and moon, the arc and swirl of energies and water. The pieces from this series express feelings that arose when the artist saw the baskets made by the Yanomami, a tribe on the border between Venezuela and Brazil, also known as the Children of the Moon. This tribe creates straw baskets with circular decoration that the artist saw as a unification of the mind and the moon they worship. This inspiration can be seen in the plaiting of the Moonbaskets.

The Alquimias 
On a rapid visit to Ireland to participate in a World Craft Council conference in 1970, on her way back to Colombia, Olga passed by Lucie Rie's studio in London (she met the British ceramist at the conference). She inspired her to incorporate gold into tapestries: "That afternoon in London I noticed a break in a ceramic vase. Lucy Rie explained to me that the breakage didn't exist for her because she transformed the piece when she mended it with gold leaf, as do the Japanese when prized porcelain breaks. The concept touched me in some mysterious place of my mind". The Alchemies series, started in 1983/84 and ongoing, was the first series made entirely with gold leaf, which the artist considered, just as the alchemists did, as a symbol of knowledge. The pieces from this series are rectangular mini "canvases" made out of cotton and prepared with white-washed gesso to be covered with acrylic paint and gold/silver leaf. After experimenting with the large scale, Olga de Amaral wanted to return to a human scale. The first 13 works in the series are based on the proportion of the human figure and inspired by the ancestral culture of Peru - its objects and science, especially mathematics. Also, when the artists visited the village of Barichara in northern Colombia, the architectural landscape of that beautiful town inspired the materials and colors used in the first pieces in the series too - clay-colored linen predominantly with white, gold and blue tones. Gold has played an important role both in various Native American cultures and in the Catholic religion. The artist realised that the application of gold made the weaving appear heavy and flexible, a quality she was looking for after the early large scale weavings that had an architectural and sculptural intention. Unlike those massive constructions woven with heavy fibres such as horsehair and coarse hand-spun wool, the Alchemies are more concerned with how surfaces, textures and finishes transform the space they occupy or contain. The pieces from this series hang in a vertical, gravitational way and separated from the wall, as if they were living in their own unique space. The effect, the atmospheres they create when hung together are similar to when you enter a colonial church or the burial chambers of pre-Columbian cultures. "It has always been my desire to induce a (…) state of silence in the places where I install my pieces."

Fiber as canvas. The 1990s 
In the 1990s Olga de Amaral started the following series: Vesitigios, Ríos, Puertas, Pueblos, Cajas, Umbras, Bosques, Segmentos, Mementos, Imágenes perdidas, Entornos quietos, Sombras, Lunas, Paisajes heredados, Estelas and the series Prosa and Soles cuadrados.

The Umbras 
The title refers either to the area of the shadow of an eclipse or the dark center of a sunspot. Although the pieces in this series are rigid and immobile structures, they create vibrant, visually fluid surfaces through the use of silver or gold leaf that shade or reflect light. Together with the way the woven strands bend, the effect of each piece of this series is undefinable. Another particularity of this is series is bound to the outside and inside in the process of weaving. "In the Umbras the reverse is always the hidden layer. The back of each strand supports the color that the face reflects, and the entire back is the skeleton of the visible surface."

The Bosques 
This series consists of diptychs whose rigor of surface departs radically from the abundance of the previous decade of Amaral's work. Bridging the spaces is a square or a rectangle, in some cases with a shift in color but not in form. The geometric forms seem to be in movement from one plane to another.

The Estelas 
In the series of the Estelas started in 1996, just like with the Umbras, the inside and outside again came to the artist's consideration. The title refers to the Spanish word estrella that stands for star and "es tela" that stands for "is [made of] fabric". Olga de Amaral has always considered the back of her pieces as a side to experiment, but in this series she decided to work on both sides as equal. The front of the Stelae is luminous gold and the back dark silver, still maintaining the vestiges of the original experimental function of this side. "I think of them as stones full of space, each one a presence full of secrets. Many together, like mounds of stones or rocks, point to an answer, an unknown order, a hidden history". These pieces gained a three-dimensional character as they are always exhibited suspended from the ceiling at different elevations and angles and in a group, with each side (golden or silver) facing in one direction. The effect of these pieces is contradictory - being both solid surfaces, bringing the solidity of the ruins of past civilisations, and at the same time floating and immutable. The Stelae were shown at Galería Diners in Bogotá and in museums in the United States and Europe in 1999.

2000-2010 and recent work 
After the year 2000 Olga de Amaral started the following series: Ombríos, Mapas, Escritos, Aguas/Aquas, Glyphs, Alforjas, Espejos, Piedras, Stratas, Nudos, Memorias, Policromos, Entre ríos, Pozos azules, the series Sol rojo, Árboles, Brumas, Dos mitades, Moyas, Nébulas, Fósiles, Núcleos, Rocas, Minutas, Improntas and Lienzos.

Collections 
de Amaral;s work is in the collection of the Art Institute of Chicago, the Cleveland Museum of Art, the Metropolitan Museum of Art, the Museum of Modern Art, the Smithsonian American Art Museum, and the Tate.

de Amaral's work, Montaña #13, was acquired by the Smithsonian American Art Museum as part of the Renwick Gallery's 50th Anniversary Campaign.

Awards and recognitions 
 1973 Guggenheim Fellowship, New York, USA.
 2010 Member of the Academia Nacional de Bellas Artes in Buenos Aires, Argentina.
 2011 Honoree of the Multicultural Benefit Gala at the Metropolitan Museum of Art, New York, USA.

References

External links

 
 Video, The House of My Imagination
 Video from the exhibition at Latin American Masters in 2012.
 Video from the exhibition in London in 2013.
 Video from the exhibition "Color Sombra" in Galería La Cometa in Bogotá, Colombia.
 "Form and Fiber: Olga de Amaral's Textiles Weave Craft with Abstraction", 2016 article on Phillips.com.

1932 births
Living people
20th-century women textile artists
20th-century textile artists
20th-century Colombian women artists
21st-century women textile artists
21st-century textile artists
21st-century Colombian women artists
Cranbrook Academy of Art alumni
Colombian weavers
Colombian expatriates in the United States